Þórir Jónsson (22 August 1926 – 1 July 2017) was an Icelandic alpine skier.  He competed in two events in the 1948 Winter Olympics.

References

1926 births
2017 deaths
Thorir Jonsson
Alpine skiers at the 1948 Winter Olympics
Thorir Jonsson
20th-century Icelandic people